Attorney General Price may refer to:

John G. Price (1871–1930), Attorney General of Ohio
William Herbert Price (1877–1963), Attorney General of Ontario

See also
General Price (disambiguation)